Fiona is the self-titled first studio album by singer Fiona, released in 1985 through Atlantic Records and reissued in 2004 through Wounded Bird Records. It reached #71 on that year's Billboard 200 chart and remained charted for a week, whilst its lone single "Talk to Me" reached #12 and #64 on Billboard's Hot Mainstream Rock Tracks and Hot 100 charts respectively.

Track listing

Personnel
Fiona – lead vocals
Bobby Messano – guitar
Gregory Tebbitt – rhythm guitar on "Love Makes You Blind"
Benjy King – keyboard
Aaron Hurwitz – keyboard
Peter Zale – keyboard
Joe Franco – drums, percussion
Donnie Kisselbach – bass
Schuyler Deale – bass on "Love Makes You Blind"
Rick Bell – saxophone on "Talk to Me" and "James"
Elena Aazan, Tom Flanagan, Peppi Marchello, Louie Merlino, "The Mob", Tara O'Boyle, Jimmy Wilcox – backing vocals
Technical
Gary Heery - cover photography

Chart performance
Album

Singles

References

Fiona (singer) albums
1985 debut albums
Atlantic Records albums